Olga Aleksandrovna Kochneva (born 29 June 1988), also known as Olga Lukianova (Ольга Лукьянова), is a Russian fencer. She represented her country at the 2016 Summer Olympics, where she won the bronze medal in the women's team épée event.

Awards 

 Honored Master of Sports of Russia. Master of Sports of Russia.
 Awarded the Medal of the Order  For Merit to the Fatherland (August 25, 2016) — for high achievements in sports at the Games XXXI Olympiad in 2016 in the city of Rio de Janeiro (Brazil), manifested the will to win and sense of purpose.

References

External links 
 
 
 
 
 
 

1988 births
Living people
People from Dzerzhinsk, Russia
Russian female épée fencers
Fencers at the 2016 Summer Olympics
Olympic fencers of Russia
Olympic bronze medalists for Russia
Olympic medalists in fencing
Medalists at the 2016 Summer Olympics
Universiade medalists in fencing
Recipients of the Medal of the Order "For Merit to the Fatherland" II class
Universiade silver medalists for Russia
Universiade bronze medalists for Russia
European Games competitors for Russia
Fencers at the 2015 European Games
Medalists at the 2009 Summer Universiade
Sportspeople from Nizhny Novgorod Oblast
21st-century Russian women